Edmund C. Schilling Jr. (born January 4, 1966) is an American college basketball coach and former player who is an assistant coach for the Grand Canyon Antelopes. Previously he served as the head coach of the Wright State Raiders.

College career
Schilling was a starting point guard at Miami (Ohio) for four years from 1984-88. He holds the program's career assists record with 629. His teams made appearances in the NCAA Division I men's basketball tournament twice.

Coaching career

High school
At age 22, Schilling began his coaching career in the high school ranks and has held three head coaching positions in high school. He was the head coach at Western Boone Junior-Senior High School from 1988-91. The team had won one game the season before his arrival, and he posted records of 5-16, 11-10 and 15-7 in his three seasons. He moved to Logansport High School for 1991-95.

He coached the United States for the McDonald's All-American Game in 1991 and was its youngest ever head coach.

Following stints in the NBA and as a college assistant and head coach, Schilling returned to high school coaching for 2009-13 at Park Tudor School.

College Assistant
Schilling has spent 10 seasons on the bench of Division 1 programs including UMass, Wright State, Memphis, UCLA, Indiana and Grand Canyon. Schilling worked under John Calipari at UMass.

New Jersey Nets
Schilling was the first assistant coach hire on the staff of new New Jersey Nets head coach John Calipari for the 1996-97 season. At 30 years old, he was the youngest coach in the NBA and one of the youngest people in the Nets' locker room.

Wright State
Schilling was hired to lead the Wright State program on March 19, 1997, taking over for Ralph Underhill. He was the head coach for six seasons and went 75-93 in his six seasons. He was dismissed in 2003 with three years remaining on his contract.

Grand Canyon
Newly-hired Grand Canyon head coach Bryce Drew added Schilling to his staff on April 1, 2020. In the staff's first season, the program won its first conference title at the Division 1 level and qualified for its first NCAA Tournament.

Personal life
Schilling's father, Ed Sr., played college basketball at Butler and was inducted into the school's hall of fame in 2002. Schilling's wife, April, was a former assistant coach for the Indiana Fever.

Head coaching record

References

External links
 Stats at Basketball-Reference

1966 births
Living people
American men's basketball coaches
American men's basketball players
Basketball coaches from Indiana
Basketball players from Indiana
College men's basketball head coaches in the United States
Grand Canyon Antelopes men's basketball coaches
High school basketball coaches in Indiana
Indiana Hoosiers men's basketball coaches
Memphis Tigers men's basketball coaches
Miami RedHawks men's basketball players
New Jersey Nets assistant coaches
Point guards
UCLA Bruins men's basketball coaches
UMass Minutemen basketball coaches
Wright State Raiders men's basketball coaches